Adnan Mohammad Awad Al-Shuaibat (born 15 February 1973), known as Adnan Awad, is a Jordanian footballer, who played as a defender for Al-Faisaly (Amman), which he currently coaches, and the Jordan national football team.

Career
He marked his retirement in playing football on 22 August 2011 in Amman at the Amman International Stadium in an international friendly match between Jordan and Tunisia in preparation for the 2014 WC qualifications. After Adnan played the first few minutes of the match, he gave the captain armband to his international teammate Bashar Bani Yaseen as well as his #5 jersey to his younger teammate from Al-Faisaly Mohammad Muneer.

Honors and Participation in International Tournaments

In Pan Arab Games 
1997 Pan Arab Games
1999 Pan Arab Games

In Arab Nations Cup 
1998 Arab Nations Cup
2002 Arab Nations Cup

In WAFF Championships 
2000 WAFF Championship
2002 WAFF Championship

References
Adnan Awad: "I Will Retire Playing, But I Will Not Leave Football... I Thank the King Abdullah II and Captain Mohammad Awad!"
Tremendous Draw Between Jordan and Tunisia in Adnan Awad's Retirement 
Adnan Awad Head Coach of Jordan U-17

External links 

1973 births
Living people
Jordanian footballers
Jordan international footballers
Association football defenders
Al-Muharraq SC players
Al-Faisaly SC players
Sportspeople from Amman
Russian Premier League players
FC KAMAZ Naberezhnye Chelny players
Jordanian expatriates in Russia